Paavo Voutilainen (born 25 February 1999) is a Finnish professional footballer who plays for FC KTP, as a centre back.

Career
Voutilainen has played for Lahti and Lahti Akatemia. On 25 January 2019, Voutilainen signed a two-year contract with FC KTP.

References

External links

1999 births
Living people
Finnish footballers
FC Lahti players
FC Kuusysi players
Pallokerho Keski-Uusimaa players
Kotkan Työväen Palloilijat players
Kakkonen players
Veikkausliiga players
Association football defenders
People from Imatra
Sportspeople from South Karelia